Green Car Crash (Green Burning Car I)  is a painting by the American artist Andy Warhol. On May 16, 2007 at 7 P.M, it sold for $71.7m (£42.3m) at auction.

History
Green Car Crash (Green Burning Car I) is one of the representative paintings of the Pop Culture. It is a part of the Death and Disaster series painted by Andy Warhol in 1963. The painting is attributed to Warhol himself, but it is assumed that his assistant Gerard Malanga had a large contribution to this creation. Green Car Crash is one of the highly valued paintings of this collection. Green Car Crash was finished in 1963. It was inspired by photographs taken by John Whitehead and published in Newsweek magazine. The car was pursued by the Seattle police. Green Car Crash (Green Burning Car I) is the only Warhol Burning Car painting of five (all based on Whitehead's photograph) to utilize a color other than black and white.

Auctions and market value
Green Car Crash was privately owned for more than 30 years, and when it was put up for sale in 2007, it generated a large amount of interest. By that time, it set a new record for an Andy Warhol creation, being sold for $71.7 million, while the pre-auction estimate was $25 million.

The record was broken in 2013, when another painting of the collection, the Silver Car Crash (Double Disaster) was sold for $105.4 million.

References

Paintings by Andy Warhol
1963 paintings